Lincoln is the name of some places in the U.S. state of Wisconsin:
Lincoln, Adams County, Wisconsin, a town
Lincoln, Bayfield County, Wisconsin, a town
Lincoln, Buffalo County, Wisconsin, a town
Lincoln, Burnett County, Wisconsin, a town
Lincoln, Eau Claire County, Wisconsin, a town
Lincoln, Forest County, Wisconsin, a town
Lincoln, Kewaunee County, Wisconsin, a town
Lincoln (community), Wisconsin, an unincorporated community in the Kewaunee County town
Lincoln, Monroe County, Wisconsin, a town
Lincoln, Polk County, Wisconsin, a town
Lincoln, Trempealeau County, Wisconsin, a town
Lincoln, Vilas County, Wisconsin, a town
Lincoln, Wood County, Wisconsin, a town